Magallana is a genus of true oysters (family Ostreidae) containing some of the most important oysters used for food. Species in this genus have been moved from Crassostrea after it was found to be paraphyletic.

Species

Extant species 
Extant species include:
 Magallana ariakensis (Fujita, 1913) – Suminoe oyster
 Magallana belcheri (G.B. Sowerby II, 1871)
 Magallana bilineata (Röding, 1798) - Philippine cupped oyster (talabang tsinelas)
 Magallana dactylena (Iredale, 1939)
 Magallana gigas (Thunberg, 1793) (syn. C. talienwhanensis) – Pacific oyster
 Magallana hongkongensis (Lam & Morton, 2003)
 Magallana nippona (Seki, 1934)
 Magallana rivularis (Gould, 1861)
 Magallana sikamea (Amemiya, 1928) – Kumamoto oyster

Genetics 
The genome of Magallana gigas has been recently sequenced  revealing an extensive set of genes that enable it to cope with environmental stresses.

References 

 
Bivalve genera

Extant Early Cretaceous first appearances